Hart's inversors are two planar mechanisms that provide a perfect straight line motion using only rotary joints.  They were invented and published by Harry Hart in 1874–5.

Hart's first inversor
Hart's first inversor, also known as Hart's W-frame, is based on an antiparallelogram. The addition of fixed points and a driving arm make it a 6-bar linkage.  It can be used to convert rotary motion to a perfect straight line by fixing a point on one short link and driving a point on another link in a circular arc.

Rectilinear bar and quadruplanar inversors

Hart's first inversor is demonstrated as a six-bar linkage with only a single point that travels in a straight line. This can be modified into an eight-bar linkage with a bar that travels in a rectilinear fashion, by taking the ground and input (shown as cyan in the animation), and appending it onto the original output.

A further generalization by James Joseph Sylvester and Alfred Kempe extends this such that the bars can instead be pairs of plates with similar dimensions.

Hart's second inversor

Hart's second inversor, also known as Hart's A-frame, is less flexible in its dimensions, but has the useful property that the motion perpendicularly bisects the fixed base points.  It is shaped like a capital A – a stacked trapezium and triangle.  It is also a 6-bar linkage.

Geometric construction of the A-frame inversor

Example dimensions 
These are the example dimensions that you see in the animations on the right.

See also

 Linkage (mechanical)
 Quadruplanar inversor, a generalization of Hart's first inversor
 Straight line mechanism

Notes

References

External links

bham.ac.uk – Hart's A-frame (draggable animation) 6-bar linkage 

Linkages (mechanical)
Linear motion

Straight line mechanisms